was a Japanese photographer.

See also
Tokyo Polytechnic University
Camera Mainichi
Asahi Camera

References

Japanese photographers
1936 births
2008 deaths